Javier Sánchez may refer to:
Javier Sánchez (architect) (fl. 1990s–2000s), Mexican architect and developer
Javier Sánchez (footballer) (born 1947), former professional footballer from Mexico
Javier Sánchez (tennis) (born 1968), former professional tennis player from Spain
Javier Sánchez (water polo) (born 1975), Spanish water polo player
Javier Sánchez Broto (born 1971), former professional footballer from Spain
Javier Ozmar Sánchez (born 1994), Mexican footballer
Javi Sánchez (footballer) (born 1997), Spanish footballer
Javi Sánchez (futsal player) (born 1971), Spanish futsal player

See also
Sánchez (surname)